Kattur may refer to the following places:

Kattur, Chennai, Tamil Nadu, India
Kattur, Thanjavur district, Tamil Nadu
Kattur, Thiruvarur district, Tamil Nadu

See also
Kattoor (disambiguation)